Paul Miles-Kingston (born 8 April 1972, in London, England), is a British singer who achieved fame as a boy soprano classical singer.

Childhood and singing career
In 1982, Paul Miles-Kingston won a choral scholarship into Winchester Cathedral Choir. While a chorister, he sang many solos in services, broadcasts and oratorios; he toured Western Canada with the choir in 1983, and sang with them at the BBC Proms. He won several prizes as a chorister for his outstanding solo singing and also for his musical contribution at The Pilgrims' School (the Winchester Cathedral Choir School).

Paul achieved great success as treble soloist in Andrew Lloyd Webber's Requiem appearing with Sarah Brightman, Plácido Domingo and The Winchester Cathedral Choir at the world premiere in New York City and The British premiere in Westminster Abbey. He was awarded a silver disc for the single, Pie Jesu, which reached number 3 in the charts, and also received gold and platinum discs for the album, which sold over 400,000 copies by 1985. In that same year, Paul sang twice at the Barbican Centre in London and also took part in a Gala Royal attended by the Queen in Edinburgh.

Miles-Kingston was Head Chorister of Winchester Cathedral from January to July 1985. At that time Martin Neary was Organist and Master of the Choristers.

Adult career and private life
Paul Miles-Kingston works at St Peter's School, York as the director of music. His son, Will Miles-Kingston, is tutored by him in singing and
as a chorister at York Minster won the BBC Radio 2 Young Choristers of the Year competition in 2019.

Singles
"Panis angelicus"
"I Wonder as I Wander"
"Bulalow"
"Pie Jesu"
"Lullaby My Liking"
"Lord's Prayer"
"Nunc Dimittis"
"Bist du bei mir"
"A Dedication with Carole & Paul Miles Kingston"

References

External links
The Boy Choir & Soloist Directory
Singing as a 10-year-old, with Sarah Brightman

1972 births
Living people
English male singers
English opera singers
English child singers
English male musical theatre actors
Boy sopranos